Matthew Register (born September 2, 1989) is a Canadian professional ice hockey defenceman who currently plays with the Idaho Steelheads in the ECHL.

Playing career
Register made his professional debut on January 25, 2012, playing defence for the Allen Americans of the Central Hockey League in a 2–0 home game shut-out over the Arizona Sundogs.

On February 22, 2013, the Manchester Monarchs of the American Hockey League (AHL) signed Register to a one-year AHL contract and then loaned him to the Ontario Reign of the ECHL where he skated in 17 regular season games and 10 playoff contests during the 2012–13 season.

On July 3, 2013, the Ontario Reign re-signed Register for the 2013–14 ECHL season.

On June 10, 2014, Register signed a one-year contract with Hungarian club Alba Volán Székesfehérvár, competing in the Austrian Hockey League (EBEL). Prior to the 2014–15 season, Register was released from his contract and returned to North America, in accepting a try-out to the Chicago Wolves AHL training camp. On October 1, 2014, Register agreed to return to the Reign in signing a standard player contract.

In the 2015–16 season, Register initially signed with the Atlanta Gladiators of the ECHL. Appearing in 40 games with the Glads, he contributed with 27 points before he was dealt to reigning Champions, the Allen Americans on March 10, 2016. Register closed out the season among the Americans' top four defenders with 10 points in 13 games. In the post-season, Register featured in every game, helping the Americans defend the Kelly Cup with 8 points in 23 games.

On September 12, 2016, Register continued his ECHL career, agreeing to a one-year deal with his fourth ECHL club, the Colorado Eagles. In the 2016–17, Register quickly established himself as the club's top defender, recapturing his form with the Ontario Reign in recording career highs with 18 goals and 64 points in 72 regular season games to be honored with his second career ECHL Defenseman of the year accolade. In the post-season, Register led the Eagles from the blueline scoring 8 goals and 24 points in just 20 games to claim his second consecutive Kelly Cup.

During the post-season run, Register agreed for the following season to move abroad to Austria, signing a one-year deal with EC VSV of the EBEL on May 2, 2017. Following his Kelly Cup success, Register had a change of heart and despite not signing an out-clause to his contract, he refused to start his contract with Villach. He was released from his contract on June 28, 2017. On September 12, 2017, Register re-signed to continue his tenure with the Colorado Eagles for the 2017–18 season. Register again led the Eagles defense, replicating his impressive feat of earning a consecutive selection to the ECHL's First All-Star Team and named the Defenseman of the Year with a career best 65 points in 72 games. He helped Colorado defend the Kelly Cup, contributing with 20 points in 24 games.

With the promotion of the Eagles to the AHL in the off-season, Register left as a free agent and opted to continue in the ECHL, agreeing to terms with the Toledo Walleye on September 11, 2018. On September 13, 2018, he was invited to attend NHL affiliate, the Detroit Red Wings training camp in preparation for the 2018–19 season. Returning to the Walleye, Register registered 46 points in 62 regular season games. In the post-season, Register failed to win the Championship for the fourth consecutive season, despite posting 19 points in 24 games and advancing to the Kelly Cup Finals.

On August 31, 2019, Register signed a contract in a return to former club the Allen Americans. Prior to the 2019–20 season, Register attended the Americans AHL affiliate training camp and was signed to a PTO with the Iowa Wild on October 3, 2019.

In June 2021, UK EIHL side Cardiff Devils announced Register had agreed to terms and signed for the 2021–22 season. Register helped Cardiff win the 2022 EIHL play-off title, while also being named as a Second Team All-Star.

In October 2022, Register agreed terms to return to North America with ECHL side Idaho Steelheads.

Career statistics

Awards and honours

References

External links

1989 births
Living people
Allen Americans players
Arizona Sundogs players
Atlanta Gladiators players
Bonnyville Pontiacs players
Canadian ice hockey defencemen
Cardiff Devils players
Chicago Wolves players
Colorado Eagles players
Hartford Wolf Pack players
Idaho Steelheads (ECHL) players
Iowa Wild players
Ontario Reign (ECHL) players
Ice hockey people from Calgary
Toledo Walleye players
Tulsa Oilers (1992–present) players
Canadian expatriate ice hockey players in the United States
Canadian expatriate ice hockey players in Wales